

A2IM Libera Awards
The American Association of Independent Music hosts the Libera Awards to award achievements in independent music. 

!Ref.
|-
| 2021
|"La vita nuova"
| Video of the Year
| 
| style="text-align:center;" |

AIM Independent Music Awards
The AIM Independent Music Awards, hosted by the Association of Independent Music (AIM), were established in 2011 to recognize artists signed to independent record labels in the United Kingdom. 

!Ref.
|-
| rowspan="2"| 2016
| Independent Breakthrough of the Year
| Himself
| 
| style="text-align:center;" | 
|-
| Independent Track of the Year
| "Tilted"
| 
| style="text-align:center;" | 
|-
| 2018
| Independent Track of the Year
| "Girlfriend"
| 
| style="text-align:center;" | 
|-
| rowspan=2|2019
| Independent Album of the Year
| Chris
| 
| rowspan=2 style="text-align:center;" | 
|-
| Independent Video of the Year
| "5 Dollars"
|

Attitude Magazine Awards
The Attitude Magazine Awards are dedicated to honouring those who inspire and make change, influence and entertain, making LGBT+ lives easier. Attitude Awards winners are those who use their platform to show how talented and diverse the LGBT+ community is, whether they identify as LGBT+ or not, and take the time to fight in our corner. 

!Ref.
|-
| 2019
| Himself
| The Artist Award
| 
| style="text-align:center;" |

BBC Music Awards
The BBC Music Awards are the BBC's annual pop music awards, held every December, as a celebration of the musical achievements over the past twelve months. The event is coordinated by the BBC's music division, BBC Music.

!Ref.
|-
| 2016
| "Sorry"
| Radio 1 Live Lounge Performance of the Year
| 
| style="text-align:center;" |

Best Art Vinyl
The Best Art Vinyl is an annual award that began in 2005. It celebrates artists and designers of vinyl record cover art. The favourites are voted for by the public from a selection of nominations by judges within the world of art and music.

!Ref.
|-
| 2018
|Chris
| Best Art Vinyl 
| 
| style="text-align:center;" |

Brit Awards
The BRIT Awards (often simply called The BRITs) are the British Phonographic Industry's annual popular music awards.

!Ref.
|-
| 2017
| rowspan=2|Himself
| rowspan=2|International Female Solo Artist
| 
| style="text-align:center;" | 
|-
| 2019
| 
| style="text-align:center;" |

British LGBT Awards
The British LGBT Awards are a British award show that aim to recognize individuals and organizations that display "outstanding" commitment to the LGBT community.

!Ref.
|-
| 2020
| Himself
| Music Artist
| 
|

European Border Breakers Awards
The European Border Breakers Awards (EBBA) were established in 2004 by the European Commission and several companies and organizations within the European music business. Awards are presented to musicians and bands with the best selling debut albums in the European Union, not counting their home country.

!Ref.
|-
|2016
| Chaleur humaine
| Album of the Year (France)
| 
| style="text-align:center;" |

Elle Style Awards
The Elle Style Awards are an awards ceremony hosted annually by Elle magazine.

!Ref.
|-
| 2017
| Chaleur humaine
| Album of the Year
| 
| style="text-align:center;" |

GAFFA Awards

GAFFA Awards (Denmark)
The GAFFA Awards (Danish: GAFFA Prisen) have been awarded in the field of popular music since 1991 by Danish magazine GAFFA .

|-
| rowspan=4|2019
| rowspan=2|Himself
| Best International Breakthrough
| 
|-
| Best International Band
| 
|-
| Chris
| Best International Album
| 
|-
| "Girlfriend"
| rowspan=2|Best International Hit
| 
|-
| rowspan=3|2021
| "People, I've Been Sad" 
| 
|-
| Himself
| Best International Solo Act
| 
|-
| La Vita Nuova
| Best International Album
|

GAFFA Awards (Sweden)
The GAFFA Awards (Swedish: GAFFA Priset) have been awarded in the field of popular music since 2010 by GAFFA Sweden.

|-
| 2019
| Himself 
| Best International Breakthrough
|

GLAAD Media Awards
The GLAAD Media Awards were created in 1990 by the Gay & Lesbian Alliance Against Defamation to "recognize and honor media for their fair, accurate and inclusive representations of the LGBT community and the issues that affect their lives.

!Ref.
|-
| 2019
| Chris
| Outstanding Music Artist
| 
| style="text-align:center;" |

Globe de Cristal Awards
The Globe de Cristal Awards is a set of awards bestowed by members of the French PA Media news agency recognizing excellence in home art and culture.

!Ref.
|-
| 2015
| Chaleur humaine
| rowspan=3|Best Female Performer
| 
| style="text-align:center;" | 
|-
| 2017
| Chaleur humaine
| 
| style="text-align:center;" | 
|-
| 2019
| Chris
| 
| style="text-align:center;" |

IMPALA Awards
The Independent Music Companies Association (IMPALA) is a non-profit trade body established in April 2000 to help European independent music companies represent their own agenda and promote independent music in the interests of artistic, entrepreneurial and cultural diversity.

!Ref.
|-
| 2017
| Chaleur humaine
| rowspan=2|Album of the Year
| 
| style="text-align:center;" | 
|-
| 2019
| Chris
| 
| style="text-align:center;" |

MTV Europe Music Awards
Established in 1994, the MTV Europe Music Awards (MTV EMA) are awards presented by ViacomCBS to honour artists and music in pop culture in Europe.

!Ref.
|-
| 2014
| rowspan=2|Himself
| rowspan=2|Best French Act
| 
| style="text-align:center;" | 
|-
| 2015
| 
| style="text-align:center;" |

Music Week Awards
Founded by British music magazine Music Week, the Music Week Awards are presented annually.

!Ref.
|-
| 2019
| Himself
| Artist Marketing Campaign 
| 
| style="text-align:center;" |

NME Awards
The NME Awards are presented on an annual music awards show in the United Kingdom founded by the music magazine NME (New Musical Express).

!Ref.
|-
| rowspan=4|2017
| "Tilted"
| Best Track
| 
| rowspan=4 style="text-align:center;" | 
|-
| rowspan=3|Himself
| Best International Female Artist 
| 
|-
| Best New Artist
| 
|-
| Best Live Band
| 
|-
| 2020
| "Gone" (with Charli XCX)
| Best Collaboration 
| 
| style="text-align:center;" |

NRJ Music Awards
NRJ Music Awards (commonly abbreviated as an NMA) are presented by the French radio station NRJ in partnership with the television network TF1 since 2000 to honor the best in the French and worldwide music industry.

!Ref.
|-
| rowspan=2|2015
| "Tilted"
| Francophone Song of the Year
| 
| rowspan=2 style="text-align:center;" | 
|-
| rowspan=2|Himself
| rowspan=2|Francophone Female Artist of the Year
| 
|-
| 2018
| 
| style="text-align:center;" |

Q Awards
The Q Awards, last awarded in 2019, were an annual music awards programme run by the British music magazine Q, which began in 1990.

!Ref.
|-
| rowspan=2|2016
| Chaleur humaine
| Best Album
| 
| rowspan=2 style="text-align:center;" | 
|-
| rowspan=2|Himself
| Best Breakthrough Act
| 
|-
| rowspan=2|2018
| Best Solo Artist
| 
| rowspan=2 style="text-align:center;" | 
|-
| "Girlfriend"
| Best Track
| 
|-
| rowspan=2|2019
| rowspan=2|Himself
| Best Act in the World Today
| 
| style="text-align:center;" | 
|-
| Q Icon
| 
| style="text-align:center;" |

Queerty Awards
The Queerty Awards are bestowed annually in a readers-voted awards ceremony by the online magazine Queerty.

|Ref.
|-
| 2020
| "Gone" (with Charli XCX)
| Anthem
| 
| style="text-align:center;" |

Rober Awards Music Poll
The Rober Awards Music Poll is a not-for profit venture with the interest of sharing passion about music and films.

!Ref.
|-
| 2015
| Saint Claude
| Best EP
| 
| style="text-align:center;" | 
|-
| rowspan=2|2018
| rowspan=2|Himself
| Best Group or Duo
| 
| rowspan=2 style="text-align:center;" | 
|-
| Best Pop Artist 
| 
|-
| 2019
| "Gone" (with Charli XCX)
| Floorfiller of the Year
| 
| style="text-align:center;" | 
|-
| 2020
| "La vita nuova"
| Best Music Video
| 
|

Silver Clef Awards
The O2 Silver Clef Awards is an annual UK music awards lunch which has been running since 1976.

!Ref.
|-
| 2016
| Himself
| Best Live Act
| 
| style="text-align:center;" |

UK Music Video Awards
The UK Music Video Awards is an annual award ceremony founded in 2008 to recognise creativity, technical excellence and innovation in music videos and moving images for music.

!Ref.
|-
| rowspan=3|2016
| Himself
| Best Video Artist
| 
| rowspan=3 style="text-align:center;" | 
|-
| rowspan=2|"Tilted"
| Best Choreography in a Video
| 
|-
| rowspan=2|Best Pop Video - International
| 
|-
| rowspan=4|2018
| rowspan=2|"Girlfriend"
| 
| rowspan=4 style="text-align:center;" | 
|-
| rowspan=2|Best Choreography in a Video
| 
|-
| "Doesn't Matter"
| 
|-
| Himself
| Best Artist
| 
|-
| rowspan=2|2020
| "La vita nuova"
| Best Choreography in a Video
| 
|rowspan=2 style="text-align:center;" |
|-
| La vita nuova
| Best Special Video Project
| 

Victoires de la Musique
The Victoires de la Musique is an annual French award ceremony where the Victoire accolade is delivered by the French Ministry of Culture to recognize outstanding achievement in the music industry. 

!Ref.
|-
| 2014
| rowspan=2|Himself
| Group or Artist Popular Révélation of the Year
| 
| style="text-align:center;" | 
|-
| rowspan=5|2015
| Female Artist of the Year
| 
| rowspan=5 style="text-align:center;" | 
|-
| rowspan=2|"Saint Claude"
| Music Video of the Year
| 
|-
| Original Song of the Year
| 
|-
| Chaleur humaine| Album of the Year
| 
|-
| At La Gaîté lyrique, La Cigale and on tour
| rowspan=2|Musical Show, Tour or Concert of the Year
| 
|-
| rowspan=2|2016
| Tour of the Le Zénith
| 
| rowspan=2 style="text-align:center;" | 
|-
| "Tilted"
| Music Video of the Year
| 
|-
| rowspan=2|2019
| Himself
| Female Artist of the Year
| 
| rowspan=2 style="text-align:center;" |
|-
| Chris''
| Album of the Year
| 
|-
| 2021
| "La vita nuova"
| Video of the Year
| 
|

References

Christine and the Queens